The 1st Artillery Brigade is a military formation of the Republic of Korea Army. The brigade is subordinated to the I Corps.

History 
It was founded on 16 February 1953 as the 1st Corps Artillery Group. On 20 November of the same year, it was changed its name to 1st Corps Artillery Command. By 1982, the brigade had its present name.

The 1st Artillery Brigade is a large-scale brigade with unit size comparable to division. There are 16 battalions under the brigade command. Compared to other artillery brigades, which having fewer than 10 battalions at most, it can be said to be tremendous. Only the 5th Artillery Brigade have the same size.

Organization 
 
Headquarters (Goyang)
331st Target Acquisition Battalion
657th Artillery Battalion (K239)
2000th Artillery Battalion (M270)
Signal Company
2nd Artillery Group (Yangju)
355th Artillery Battalion (K9)
652nd Artillery Battalion (K9)
722nd Artillery Battalion (K9)
898th Artillery Battalion (K9)
3rd Artillery Group (Paju)
651st Artillery Battalion (K9)
655th Artillery Battalion (K9)
733rd Artillery Battalion (K9A1)
868th Artillery Battalion (K9A1)
958th Artillery Battalion (K9)
7th Artillery Group (Yangju)
106th Artillery Battalion (KH-179)
107th Artillery Battalion (KH-179)
108th Artillery Battalion (KH-179)
109th Artillery Battalion (KH-179)

References 

Republic of Korea Army
Military units and formations established in 1953
Goyang
Yangju
Paju